Morgan Frances Saylor (born October 26, 1994) is an American actress. She is best known for starring as Dana Brody in the Showtime series Homeland, 2019's Blow the Man Down and for her critically acclaimed portrayal of Leah in the 2016 Sundance film White Girl. Along with the rest of the cast of Homeland, Saylor was nominated for the Screen Actors Guild Award for Outstanding Performance by an Ensemble in a Drama Series in 2013 and 2014.

Early life 
Saylor was born in Chicago, Illinois. Her mother is an employee at REI and her father does renovations for Starbucks; they are divorced. Saylor moved to Villa Rica, Georgia at age two, and Decatur, Georgia at age ten. Saylor graduated from Decatur High School in May 2013 and subsequently moved to New York to continue acting. She attended the University of Chicago for a few years between roles, and since 2021 has been attending the Columbia University School of General Studies.

Career 
Saylor began acting through summer camps and community theater as a child. In fourth grade, she visited Los Angeles for the summer where she booked her first professional job: a voice-over as young Meadow in HBO's hit television series The Sopranos. Saylor played Annie in Cirque du Freak: The Vampire's Assistant in 2009 and young Claire in Father of Invention in 2010.

From 2011 to 2013, Saylor played Dana Brody in Homeland. The Showtime political thriller television series garnered nearly universal praise, especially for its first two seasons.

In June 2014, Saylor made her stage debut at the Manhattan Theatre Club as Penny opposite Cherry Jones and Zoe Kazan in When We Were Young and Unafraid, written by Sarah Treem and directed by Pam MacKinnon. Also in 2014, she played Gracie Highsmith in Jamie Marks Is Dead, an adaptation of Christopher Barzak's 2007 novel One for Sorrow, directed by Carter Smith.

Saylor played Kevin Costner's character's daughter Julie in the sports drama McFarland, USA, which was released on February 20, 2015. She played the role of Leah in White Girl, for which she received great critical praise. The film was written and directed by Elizabeth Wood and premiered at the 2016 Sundance Film Festival. Saylor acted alongside Nick Robinson and Common in director Rob Reiner's film Being Charlie. The film premiered at the 2015 Toronto International Film Festival in September of that year.

In 2017, Morgan was back at Sundance Film Festival to premiere the film Novitiate in which she plays a young nun opposite Melissa Leo, Margaret Qualley and Diana Agron. Later that year she starred in "Anywhere With You," formerly titled "We The Coyotes", directed by Hanna Ladoul and Marco La Via. The film premiered the following year in the ACID section of 2018 Cannes Film Festival.

Saylor's next starring role came in Blow the Man Down, which premiered in 2019 at Tribeca Film Festival and was released by Amazon Studios on March 20th, 2020. This film was shot on location in Harpswell, Maine.

The following year, Morgan starred in the independent film You Mean Everything to Me.

Personal life 
Saylor has a small anchor tattooed behind her left ear; her older brother has a similar, larger anchor tattooed on his forearm. As a teenager, Saylor was part of a competitive rock climbing team and was nationally ranked. Saylor lives in Bedford-Stuyvesant with her partner Ben Rosenfield.

Filmography

Film

Television

Theatre

Awards and nominations

References

External links 

 

1994 births
21st-century American actresses
Living people
Actresses from Chicago
Actresses from Georgia (U.S. state)
Actresses from New York City
American child actresses
American film actresses
American stage actresses
American television actresses
University of Chicago alumni
Columbia University School of General Studies alumni